Chagarotar (Çaġarotar) is a rural locality (a selo) in Khasavyurtovsky District, Republic of Dagestan, Russia. The population was 1,740 as of 2010. There are 20 streets.

Geography 
Chagarotar is located 40 km north of Khasavyurt (the district's administrative centre) by road. Novogagatli is the nearest rural locality.

References 

Rural localities in Khasavyurtovsky District